Mount Hood is a potentially active stratovolcano in the Cascade Volcanic Arc. It was formed by a subduction zone on the Pacific coast and rests in the Pacific Northwest region of the United States. In addition to being Oregon's highest mountain, it is one of the loftiest mountains in the nation based on its prominence, and it offers the only year-round lift-served skiing in North America.

The height assigned to Mount Hood's snow-covered peak has varied over its history. The peak is home to 12 named glaciers and snowfields. It is the highest point in Oregon and the fourth highest in the Cascade Range.
Mount Hood is considered the Oregon volcano most likely to erupt,
though based on its history, an explosive eruption is unlikely. Still, the odds of an eruption in the next 30 years are estimated at between 3 and 7%, so the U.S. Geological Survey (USGS) characterizes it as "potentially active", but the mountain is informally considered dormant.

Establishments

The mountain has six ski areas: Timberline, Mount Hood Meadows, Ski Bowl, Cooper Spur, Snow Bunny, and Summit.

There are a few remaining shelters on Mount Hood still in use today. Those include the Coopers Spur, Cairn Basin, and McNeil Point shelters as well as the Tilly Jane A-frame cabin. The summit was home to a fire lookout in the early 1900s; however, the lookout did not withstand the weather and no longer remains today.

The most northwestern pass around the mountain is called Lolo Pass. Native Americans crossed the pass while traveling between the Willamette Valley and Celilo Falls.

Naming

Indigenous names
The name Wy'east has been associated with Mount Hood for more than a century, but no evidence suggests that it is a genuine name for the mountain in any indigenous language. The name was possibly inspired by an 1890 work of author Frederic Balch, although Balch does not use it himself. In one version of Balch's story, the two sons of the Great Spirit Sahale fell in love with the beautiful maiden Loowit, who could not decide which to choose. The two braves, Wy'east and Pahto (unnamed in his novel, but appearing in a later adaptation), burned forests and villages in their battle over her. Sahale became enraged and smote the three lovers. Seeing what he had done, he erected three mountain peaks to mark where each fell. He made beautiful Mount St. Helens for Loowit, proud and erect Mount Hood for Wy'east, and the somber Mount Adams for the mourning Pahto.

There are other versions of the legend. In another telling, Wy'east (Hood) battles Pahto (Adams) for the fair La-wa-la-clough (St. Helens). Or again Wy'east, the chief of the Multnomah tribe, competed with the chief of the Klickitat tribe. Their great anger led to their transformation into volcanoes. Their battle is said to have destroyed the Bridge of the Gods and thus created the great Cascades Rapids of the Columbia River.

The mountain sits partly inside the reservation of the Confederated Tribes of Warm Springs. Three languages are spoken among this confederacy: Sahaptin, Upper Chinook/Kiksht (Wasco) and Numu (Paiute). Therefore, any attempt to restore the mountain's original indigenous name would require agreement on which language's name to use.

Current name

The mountain was given its present name on October 29, 1792, by Lt. William Broughton, a member of Captain George Vancouver's exploration expedition. Lt. Broughton observed its peak while at Belle Vue Point of what is now called Sauvie Island during his travels up the Columbia River, writing, "A very high, snowy mountain now appeared rising beautifully conspicuous in the midst of an extensive tract of low or moderately elevated land [location of today's Vancouver, Washington] lying S 67 E., and seemed to announce a termination to the river." Lt. Broughton named the mountain after Samuel Hood, 1st Viscount Hood, a British Admiral at the Battle of the Chesapeake.

Lewis and Clark spotted the mountain on October 18, 1805. It is at this time topped with snow. We called this the Falls Mountain, or Timm Mountain." Timm was the native name for Celilo Falls. Clark later noted that it was also Vancouver's Mount Hood.

Two French explorers from the Hudson's Bay Company may have traveled into the Dog River area east of Mount Hood in 1818. They reported climbing to a glacier on "Montagne de Neige" (Mountain of Snow), probably Eliot Glacier.

Namesakes

There have been two United States Navy ammunition ships named for Mount Hood. USS Mount Hood (AE-11) was commissioned in July 1944 and was destroyed in November 1944 while at anchor in Manus Naval Base, Admiralty Islands. Her explosive cargo ignited, resulting in 45 confirmed dead, 327 missing and 371 injured. A second ammunition ship, AE-29, was commissioned in May 1971 and decommissioned in August 1999.

Volcanic activity

The glacially eroded summit area consists of several andesitic or dacitic lava domes; Pleistocene collapses produced avalanches and lahars (rapidly moving mudflows) that traveled across the Columbia River to the north. The eroded volcano has had at least four major eruptive periods during the past 15,000 years.

The last three eruptions at Mount Hood occurred within the past 1,800 years from vents high on the southwest flank and produced deposits that were distributed primarily to the south and west along the Sandy and Zigzag rivers. The last eruptive period took place around 220 to 170 years ago, when dacitic lava domes, pyroclastic flows and mudflows were produced without major explosive eruptions. The prominent Crater Rock just below the summit is hypothesized to be the remains of one of these now-eroded domes. This period includes the last major eruption of 1781 to 1782 with a slightly more recent episode ending shortly before the arrival of the explorers Lewis and Clark in 1805. The latest minor eruptive event occurred in August 1907.

The glaciers on the mountain's upper slopes may be a source of potentially dangerous lahars when the mountain next erupts. There are vents near the summit that are known for emitting gases such as carbon dioxide and sulfur dioxide. Prior to the 1980 eruption of Mount St. Helens, the only known fatality related to volcanic activity in the Cascades occurred in 1934, when a climber suffocated in oxygen-poor air while exploring ice caves melted by fumaroles in Coalman Glacier on Mount Hood.

Since 1950, there have been several earthquake swarms each year at Mount Hood, most notably in July 1980 and June 2002.
Seismic activity is monitored by the USGS Cascades Volcano Observatory in Vancouver, Washington, which issues weekly updates (and daily updates if significant eruptive activity is occurring at a Cascades volcano).

The most recent evidence of volcanic activity at Mount Hood consists of fumaroles near Crater Rock and hot springs on the flanks of the volcano.

Monitoring controversy

A conflict exists between protecting public safety and protecting the environment. In 2014, a USGS employee, Dr. Seth Moran, proposed installing new instruments on Mount Hood to warn of volcanic activity. The instruments were installed at four different locations on the mountain, including:
three seismometers to measure earthquakes,
three Global Positioning System (GPS) instruments to measure ground movement,
one instrument to measure gas emissions.,
The proposed locations were in a protected wilderness area, tightly controlled by the United States Forest Service. The project was opposed by Wilderness Watch, an conservation group.

Three monitoring stations were eventually installed on Mount Hood in 2020.

Elevation
Mount Hood was first seen by European explorers in 1792 and is believed to have maintained a consistent summit elevation, varying by no more than a few feet due to mild seismic activity. Elevation changes since the 1950s are predominantly due to improved survey methods and model refinements of the shape of the Earth (see vertical reference datum). Despite the physical consistency, the estimated elevation of Mount Hood has varied substantially over the years, as seen in the following table:

Early explorers on the Columbia River estimated the elevation to be . Two months later, a Mr. Belden claimed to have climbed the mountain during a hunting trip and determined it to be  upon which "pores oozed blood, eyes bled, and blood rushed from their ears." Sometime by 1866, Reverend G. H. Atkinson determined it to be . Many maps distributed in the late 19th century cited , though Mitchell's School Atlas gave  as the correct value. For some time, many references assumed Mount Hood to be the highest point in North America.

Modern height surveys also vary, but not by the huge margins seen in the past. Many modern sources likewise list  as the height. Finally, a height of  has also been reported.

Glaciers

Mount Hood is host to 12
named glaciers or snow fields, the most visited of which is Palmer Glacier, partially within the Timberline Lodge ski area and on the most popular climbing route. The glaciers are almost exclusively above the  level, which also is about the average tree line elevation on Mount Hood. More than 80 percent of the glacial surface area is above .

Glaciers and snowfields cover about 80 percent of the mountain above the  level. The glaciers declined by an average of 34 percent  from 1907 to 2004. Glaciers on Mount Hood retreated through the first half of the 20th century, advanced or at least slowed their retreat in the 1960s and 1970s, and have since returned to a pattern of retreat. The neo-glacial maximum extents formed in the early 18th century.

The retreat released considerable outwash, some of which filled and flattened the upper Hood River Valley near Parkdale and formed Dee Flat.

Older glaciation produced moraines near Brightwood and distinctive cuts on the southeast side; they may date to 140,000 years ago.

Hiking

Typically, the  hike is snow-free from late July until the autumn snows begin. There are many access points, the shortest being a small walk from the Timberline Lodge. A portion of the Pacific Crest Trail is coincident with the Timberline Trail on the west side of Mount Hood.

The predecessor of the Pacific Crest Trail was the Oregon Skyline Trail, established in 1920, which connected Mount Hood to Crater Lake.

Climbing
About 10,000 people attempt to climb Mount Hood each year. It has convenient access, though it presents some technical climbing challenges. There are no trails to the summit, with even the "easier" southside climbing route constituting a technical climb with crevasses, falling rocks, and often inclement weather. Ropes, ice axes, crampons and other technical mountaineering gear are necessary. Peak climbing season is generally from April to mid-June.

There are six main routes to approach the mountain, with about 30 total variations for summiting. The climbs range in difficulty from class 2 to class 5.9+ (for Acrophobia). The most popular route, dubbed the south route, begins at Timberline Lodge and proceeds up Palmer Glacier to Crater Rock, the large prominence at the head of the glacier. The route goes east around Crater Rock and crosses the Coalman Glacier on the Hogsback, a ridge spanning from Crater Rock to the approach to the summit. The Hogsback terminates at a bergschrund where the Coalman Glacier separates from the summit rock headwall. The route continues to the Pearly Gates, a gap in the summit rock formation, then right onto the summit plateau and the summit proper.

Technical ice axes, fall protection, and experience are now recommended in order to attempt the left chute variation or Pearly Gates ice chute. The Forest Service recommends several other route options due to these changes in conditions (e.g. "Old Chute," West Crater Rim, etc.).

Climbing accidents

As of May 2002, more than 130 people had died in climbing-related accidents since records have been kept on Mount Hood, the first in 1896. Incidents in May 1986, December 2006, and December 2009 attracted intense national and international media interest. Though avalanches are a common hazard on other glaciated mountains, most Mount Hood climbing deaths are the result of falls and hypothermia. Around 50 people require rescue per year. 3.4 percent of search and rescue missions in 2006 were for mountain climbers.

See also

Gentlemen's Race (2008)
List of Ultras of the United States
Mount Hood climbing accidents
Mount Hood Corridor
Mount Hood Railroad

References

External links

"Mount Hood". The Oregon Encyclopedia

"Mount Hood: Climbing Oregon's Highest Peak". Oregon Field Guide.
"Mt. Hood's Volcanic Past". Oregon Field Guide.

 
Highest points of U.S. states
Landforms of Hood River County, Oregon
Mount Hood National Forest
Mountains of Clackamas County, Oregon
Mountains of Oregon
North American 3000 m summits
Stratovolcanoes of the United States
Subduction volcanoes
Volcanoes of Clackamas County, Oregon
Volcanoes of Oregon